Tales from the Punchbowl is the fourth studio album by the American rock band Primus, released on June 6, 1995. It was the band's last album with Tim Alexander before he rejoined Primus seven years later, and again in September 2013. It was certified Gold on July 20, 1995.

Enhanced CD reissue
In 1996 the album was re-released as an Enhanced CD for Macintosh and Windows. As printed on the back inlay for this version, "Combining high end production values, 3-D graphics, spectacular effects and loads of insanely cool stuff, the 'Tales From The Punchbowl' Enhanced CD, played on a CD-ROM drive, sends the viewer through a surreal virtual experience that features the complete album in CD sound quality (which you can hear on a stereo CD player as well)." Players must "navigate from the helm of Captain Shiner's ferryboat through an enchanted liquid atmosphere to many strange and mysterious islands. Many experiences are to be had, all in a rose-colored waterworld filled with visuals reminiscent of Dalí and Bosch." Printed on the actual CD is a ship helm instead of the large image of Captain Shiner's face that appeared on the original, more common pressing.

The vinyl cover shows a picture of the band members dressed up as penguins standing on an iceberg.  The same picture comes with the CD version, on the first page of the booklet at the front.

Reception and awards

In his review for AllMusic, Daniel Gioffre describes the album as "unabashed prog rock... which even the thick dollops of irony that the band seeks to impart to its compositions are unable to mask completely." He also says that "the high-energy angular rhythms that Primus is known and loved for are as present as ever; they are just pulled off with greater zest and looser precision (if there is such a thing) than they have in the past", concluding that "Tales From the Punchbowl is one of Primus' finer discs." Robert Christgau describes the album simply as "modern teen horrors simplified–and funkified." Chuck Eddy of Entertainment Weekly gave the album a B and said, "Hearing Les Claypool thwap oppressive bass lines while rapping like a congested auctioneer isn't nearly as entertaining as watching this trio fish for bass on MTV."

Tales from the Punchbowl was nearly as successful as Pork Soda, and peaked at number eight on the Billboard 200, making it Primus' second-highest chart position. It is also the band's last studio album to be certified gold by the RIAA.

Track listing

Personnel 
 Les Claypool – vocals, bass, six string bass, bass banjo, upright bass, fretless bass
 Larry LaLonde – guitar, 6-string banjo
 Tim Alexander – drums, drum samples

Charts

Weekly charts

Year-end charts

Singles

References

Primus (band) albums
1995 albums
Interscope Records albums
Albums with cover art by Lance Montoya